Street DNA is a British record label and the sister label of the StreetSounds label.

In November 2014, the label released Kurtis Mantronik's latest studio album, Journey to Utopia.

References

External links

English record labels